This is a list of moths of the family Tortricidae that are found in South Africa. It also acts as an index to the species articles and forms part of the full List of moths of South Africa.

Acanthoclita phaulomorpha (Meyrick, 1927)
Acleris rubi Razowski, 2005
Afroploce karsholti Aarvik, 2004
Afroploce mabalingwae Razowski, 2008
Algoforma algoana (Felder & Rogenhofer, 1875)
Algoforma paralgoana Razowski, 2005
Ancylis argenticiliana Walsingham, 1897
Ancylis falsicoma Meyrick, 1914
Ancylis halisparta Meyrick, 1909
Ancylis natalana (Walsingham, 1881)
Anthozela chrysoxantha Meyrick, 1813
Aphelia corroborata (Meyrick, 1918)
Aphelia finita (Meyrick, 1924)
Apotoforma uncifera Razowski, 1964
Bactra adelpha Diakonoff, 1963
Bactra bactrana (Kennel, 1901)
Bactra confusa Diakonoff, 1963
Bactra dolia Diakonoff, 1963
Bactra fasciata Diakonoff, 1963
Bactra jansei Diakonoff, 1963
Bactra legitima Meyrick, 1911
Bactra punctistrigana Mabille, 1900
Bactra pythonia Meyrick, 1909
Bactra rhabdonoma Diakonoff, 1963
Bactra salpictris Diakonoff, 1963
Bactra sardonia (Meyrick, 1908)
Bactra scrupulosa Meyrick, 1911
Bactra sinassula Diakonoff, 1963
Bactra sordidata Diakonoff, 1963
Bactra spinosa Diakonoff, 1963
Bactra stagnicolana Zeller, 1852
Bactra tradens Diakonoff, 1963
Bactra trimera Diakonoff, 1963
Bactra tylophora Diakonoff, 1963
Bactra verutana Zeller, 1876
Brachiolia egenella (Walker, 1864)
Brachiolia obscurana Razowski, 1966
Brachioxena lutrocopa (Meyrick, 1914)
Brachioxena psammacta (Meyrick, 1908)
Bubonoxena ephippias (Meyrick, 1907)
Cacoecimorpha pronubana (Hübner, 1799)
Camptrodoxa inclyta Meyrick, 1925
Catamacta scrutatrix Meyrick, 1912
Celypha sistrata (Meyrick, 1911)
Choristoneura heliaspis (Meyrick, 1909)
Choristoneura psoricodes (Meyrick, 1911)
Clepsis monochroa Razowski, 2006
Cnephasia captiva Meyrick, 1911
Cnephasia catastrepta Meyrick, 1926
Cnephasia chlorocrossa Meyrick, 1926
Cnephasia ergastularis Meyrick, 1911
Cnephasia flavisecta Meyrick, 1918
Cnephasia macrostoma Meyrick, 1920
Cnephasia opsarias Meyrick, 1911
Cnephasia pachydesma Meyrick, 1918
Cnephasia phalarocosma Meyrick, 1937
Cnephasia tigrina (Walsingham, 1891)
Coccothera areata (Meyrick, 1918)
Coccothera spissana (Zeller, 1852)
Coccothera victrix (Meyrick, 1918)
Coniostola calculosa (Meyrick, 1913)
Coniostola symbola (Meyrick, 1909)
Cosmetra spiculifera (Meyrick, 1913)
Cosmorrhyncha microcosma Aarvik, 2004
Crocidosema plebejana Zeller, 1847
Crocidosema thematica (Meyrick, 1918)
Cryptaspasma caryothicta (Meyrick, 1920)
Cryptaspasma querula (Meyrick, 1912)
Cryptophlebia peltastica (Meyrick, 1921)
Cryptophlebia rhizophorae Vári, 1981
Cryptophlebia semilunana (Saalmüller, 1880)
Cydia anthracotis (Meyrick, 1913)
Cydia campestris (Meyrick, 1914)
Cydia choleropa (Meyrick, 1913)
Cydia cyanocephala (Meyrick, 1921)
Cydia euclera (Meyrick, 1921)
Cydia excoriata (Meyrick, 1918)
Cydia leptogramma (Meyrick, 1913)
Cydia malacodes (Meyrick, 1911)
Cydia modica (Meyrick, 1913)
Cydia ocnogramma (Meyrick, 1910)
Cydia pomonella (Linnaeus, 1758)
Cydia tumulata Meyrick, 1908
Cydia violescens (Meyrick, 1918)
Dichrorampha embolaea (Meyrick, 1918)
Doliochastis homograpta Meyrick, 1920
Droceta cedrota (Meyrick, 1908)
Eccopsis incultana (Walker, 1863)
Eccopsis nebulana Walsingham, 1891
Eccopsis ofcolacona Razowski, 2008
Eccopsis praecedens Walsingham, 1897
Eccopsis ptilonota (Meyrick, 1921)
Eccopsis wahlbergiana Zeller, 1852
Epiblema leucopetra (Meyrick, 1908)
Epiblema riciniata (Meyrick, 1911)
Epichorista cinerata Meyrick, 1920
Epichorista exanimata Meyrick, 1920
Epichorista niphosema Meyrick, 1917
Epichorista perversa Meyrick, 1912
Epichorista phalaraea Meyrick, 1920
Epichorista vestigialis Meyrick, 1914
Epichoristodes acerbella (Walker, 1864)
Epichoristodes spinulosa (Meyrick, 1924)
Epinotia infausta (Walsingham, 1881)
Eucosma accipitrina Meyrick, 1913
Eucosma actuosa Meyrick, 1913
Eucosma amara Meyrick, 1913
Eucosma calliarma Meyrick, 1909
Eucosma chloroterma Meyrick, 1913
Eucosma clarifica Meyrick, 1913
Eucosma drastica Meyrick, 1918
Eucosma galactitis Meyrick, 1912
Eucosma glyphicodes Meyrick, 1918
Eucosma inscita Meyrick, 1913
Eucosma insolens Meyrick, 1909
Eucosma lochmaea Meyrick, 1920
Eucosma marmara Meyrick, 1909
Eucosma nasuta Meyrick, 1911
Eucosma niphaspis Meyrick, 1928
Eucosma passiva Meyrick, 1913
Eucosma projecta Meyrick, 1921
Eucosma salticola Meyrick, 1913
Eucosma siccescens Meyrick, 1912
Eucosma sollennis Meyrick, 1913
Eucosma tenax Meyrick, 1920
Eucosma thalameuta Meyrick, 1918
Eucosma tremula Meyrick, 1909
Eucosmocydia monitrix (Meyrick, 1909)
Eugnosta anxifera Razowski, 1993
Eugnosta assecula (Meyrick, 1909)
Eugnosta feriata (Meyrick, 1913)
Eugnosta heteroclita Razowski, 1993
Eugnosta lukaszi Razowski, 2005
Eugnosta misella Razowski, 1993
Eugnosta niveicaput Razowski, 2005
Eugnosta parmisella Razowski, 2005
Eugnosta replicata (Meyrick, 1913)
Eugnosta stigmatica (Meyrick, 1909)
Eugnosta trimeni (Felder & Rogenhofer, 1875)
Eugnosta umbraculata (Meyrick, 1918)
Eugnosta vecorda Razowski, 1993
Eugnosta xanthochroma Razowski, 1993
Eupoecilia kruegeriana Razowski, 1993
Fulcrifera aphrospila (Meyrick, 1921)
Fulcrifera deltozyga (Meyrick, 1928)
Fulcrifera halmyris (Meyrick, 1909)
Fulcrifera periculosa (Meyrick, 1913)
Fulcrifera psamminitis (Meyrick, 1913)
Fulcrifera tricentra (Meyrick, 1907)
Goniotorna pleuroptila (Meyrick, 1937)
Grapholita delineana Walker, 1863
Grapholita molesta (Busck, 1916)
Gypsonoma opsonoma (Meyrick, 1918)
Gypsonoma paradelta (Meyrick, 1925)
Gypsonoma scenica (Meyrick, 1911)
Hectaphelia hectaea (Meyrick, 1911)
Hectaphelia kapakoana Razowski, 2006
Hectaphelia metapyrrha (Meyrick, 1918)
Hectaphelia periculosa Razowski, 2006
Hectaphelia pharetrata (Meyrick, 1909)
Hectaphelia tortuosa (Meyrick, 1912)
Lobesia aeolopa Meyrick, 1907
Lobesia harmonia (Meyrick, 1908)
Lobesia metachlora (Meyrick, 1913)
Lobesia primaria (Meyrick, 1909)
Lobesia quadratica (Meyrick, 1911)
Lobesia scorpiodes (Meyrick, 1908)
Lobesia stenaspis (Meyrick, 1921)
Lobesia stericta (Meyrick, 1911)
Lozotaenia capensana (Walker, 1863)
Lozotaenia capitana Felder & Rogenhofer, 1875
Matsumuraeses melanaula (Meyrick, 1916)
Megalota lobotona (Meyrick, 1921)
Megalota sponditis (Meyrick, 1918)
Metamesia designata (Meyrick, 1921)
Metamesia elegans (Walsingham, 1881)
Metamesia incepta (Meyrick, 1912)
Metamesia intensa (Meyrick, 1921)
Nkandla flavisecta (Razowski, J. & J.W. Brown, 2009)
Olethreutes arsiptera (Meyrick, 1921)
Olethreutes asterota (Meyrick, 1918)
Olethreutes brevibasana (Walsingham, 1891)
Olethreutes carceraria (Meyrick, 1913)
Olethreutes caryocoma (Meyrick, 1918)
Olethreutes criopis (Meyrick, 1928)
Olethreutes diremptana (Walker, 1863)
Olethreutes encharacta (Meyrick, 1918)
Olethreutes erythropa (Meyrick, 1918)
Olethreutes glaphyraspis (Meyrick, 1921)
Olethreutes globigera (Meyrick, 1914)
Olethreutes nectarodes (Meyrick, 1921)
Olethreutes orichlora (Meyrick, 1920)
Olethreutes orthacta (Meyrick, 1908)
Olethreutes propitia (Meyrick, 1918)
Olethreutes sagata (Meyrick, 1913)
Olethreutes scabellana (Zeller, 1852)
Orilesa olearis (Meyrick, 1912)
Paraeccopsis acroplecta (Meyrick, 1921)
Paraeccopsis exhilarata (Meyrick, 1918)
Paraeccopsis nucleata (Meyrick, 1913)
Paraeccopsis phoeniodes (Meyrick, 1921)
Paraeccopsis windhoeca Razowski, 2008
Paramesiodes albescens (Meyrick, 1912)
Paramesiodes chloradelpha (Meyrick, 1912)
Paramesiodes geraeas (Meyrick, 1909)
Paramesiodes temulenta (Meyrick, 1912)
Phlebozemia sandrinae Diakonoff, 1985
Phtheochroa natalica Razowski, 2005
Procrica mariepskopa Razowski, 2008
Procrica pilgrima Razowski, 2008
Promodra nigrata Razowski, 2008
Promodra prodroma (Meyrick, 1913)
Pseudeboda africana Razowski, 1964
Rufeccopsis rufescens (Meyrick, 1913)
Spilonota sinuosa Meyrick, 1917
Stenentoma bisecta (Meyrick, 1918)
Strepsicrates rhothia (Meyrick, 1910)
Syndemis saburrana Zeller, 1852
Tetramoera isogramma (Meyrick, 1908)
Thaumatotibia batrachopa (Meyrick, 1908)
Thaumatotibia leucotreta (Meyrick, 1913)
Thaumatotibia macrops (Diakonoff, 1959)
Tortrix agroeca Meyrick, 1908
Tortrix biformis Meyrick, 1920
Tortrix crispata Meyrick, 1912
Tortrix diluticiliana (Walsingham, 1881)
Tortrix furtiva Meyrick, 1911
Tortrix mensaria Meyrick, 1912
Tortrix myroxesta Meyrick, 1924
Tortrix polytechna Meyrick, 1924
Tortrix spilographa Meyrick, 1937
Tortrix sporadias Meyrick, 1920
Tortrix symplecta Meyrick, 1910
Trymalitis scalifera Meyrick, 1912
Tuckia africana (Walsingham, 1881)
Tuckia zuluana Razowski, 2001
Worcesteria recondita Razowski, 2006
Xenosocia conica (Meyrick, 1911)
Xenosocia desipiens (Meyrick, 1918)
Xenosocia paracremna (Meyrick, 1913)
Zellereccopsis caffreana Razowski, 2008

Tortricidae
 List
Moths of Africa